is a Japanese actress and voice actress from Tokyo, Japan.

Filmography
 Soul Eater (2008), Patty Thompson
 Ryoko's Case File (2008), High School Girl
 Darker than Black: Ryūsei no Gemini (2009), Ariel

References

External links
 

1989 births
Living people
Japanese video game actresses
Japanese voice actresses
Voice actresses from Tokyo